Melica serrana, is a species of grass endemic to Cerro de las Ánimas, Uruguay.

Description
The species is perennial and caespitose, with elongated rhizomes.

Both panicle axis and branches are scaberulous with solitary spikelets. Fertile spikelets are pediceled, the pedicels of which are curved, ciliate and filiform. Florets are diminished at the apex.

Its lemma is pubescent and have hairy veins with asperulous surface. The glumes are all keelless but are different in size and texture. Lower glume also have an emarginated apex while the upper one have an obtuse one. The upper glumes have glabrous surface as well. Flowers are fleshy, oblong, truncate, have 2 lodicules, and grow together.

Ecology

References

Further reading

serrana
Flora of Uruguay
Flora of South America